Pierre Nord Alexis (2 August 1820 – 1 May 1910) was President of Haiti from 17 December 1902 to 2 December 1908.

Early life
He was the son of a high-ranking official in the regime of Henri Christophe, and Blézine Georges, Christophe's illegitimate daughter. Alexis joined the army in the 1830s, serving President Jean-Louis Pierrot, his father-in-law, as an aide-de-camp.

Career
In the ensuing years, he had a tumultuous career: he was exiled in 1874 but was allowed to return to Haiti a few years later by President Pierre Théoma Boisrond-Canal. During the presidency of Lysius Salomon, he was a vocal leader of the opposition, enduring several jail sentences before Salomon was finally ousted in a revolt. The new president, Florvil Hyppolite, gave him an important military position in the north, but when President Tirésias Simon Sam resigned, he joined Anténor Firmin in a march on Port-au-Prince in an effort to seize control of the government.

The new president, however, was his old ally, Boisrond-Canal, who had returned him from exile some twenty years earlier. Canal defused the tension by appointing Alexis Minister of War, driving a wedge between him and Firmin. Troops loyal to Firmin were finally defeated in Port-au-Prince, leaving only two strongholds, Saint-Marc and Gonaïves, opposed to the new government of Canal and Alexis. Alexis took advantage of the situation by negotiating with the United States and declaring himself in support of American interests in the Caribbean. The U.S. responded by imposing a naval blockade on the two centers still loyal to Firmin, paving the way for Alexis to seize control of the government for himself. On June 28, 1902 there was a street battle in Cap-Haitien between the Firmin and Alexis partisans. During the firminist revolt in 1902 he gave Eugene Francois Magloire the defense of Fort Belair in Cap-Haitien. He made him a spy during the Civil War.

Presidency
At the age of 82, he became President on 21 December 1902 by leading troops loyal to him into the country's Chamber of Deputies. Alexis managed to hold on to power for the next six years, though his regime was plagued by rebellion. In 1903, he proclaimed Eugène Francois Magloire Commandant of Grande-Rivière du Nord, General of division of the republic and his honorary aide-de-camp. During his presidency, he took to justice all statesmen accused of corruption in 1904: " le procès de la consolidation". All who stole the state's money were judged and condemned. In January 1908, Alexis, already in his eighties, decided to have himself proclaimed President for Life. This reunited the supporters of Firmin, who launched a new revolt against Alexis. While the revolt was crushed, it exacerbated the country's existing economic problems. A famine in the south that same year led to violent food riots and a new rebellion, this time from the south, led by General François Antoine Simon. On the night of March 14, 1908 he got more than 20 firminists who were trying to overthrow him executed in front of the Cemetery of Port-au-Prince; Massillon Coicou was part of those executed firminists.

Exile
Ousted from power on 2 December 1908, Alexis went into exile in Jamaica and later relocated to New Orleans with his family, where he died on 1 May 1910. He is buried in St. Louis Cemetery #2 in New Orleans.

Family
Alexis was married to Princess Marie-Louise-Amelie-Celestina Pierrot, daughter of President Jean-Louis Pierrot (a general and later Prince under Henri I). From this marriage, he had a son who bore the name of Henri Nord Alexis, also known as Henri Alexis. His great-great-grandson Jacques-Édouard Alexis was Prime Minister of Haiti twice: from 1999 to 2001 and from 2006 to 2008.

References

External links

Presidents of Haiti
1820 births
1910 deaths
1900s in Haiti
People from Cap-Haïtien
19th-century Haitian politicians
20th-century Haitian politicians
Christophe family
Haitian people of Grenadian descent